Michael Duffy was an Irish Labour Party politician and trade union official from Dunshaughlin, County Meath. He was a member of Seanad Éireann from 1922 to 1936. He was a member of the Irish Transport and General Workers' Union and served as the president of the Irish Trades Union Congress in 1935. He was elected to the Free State Seanad for 9 years at the 1922 election, and was re-elected for another 9 years at the 1931 election. He served until the Free State Seanad was abolished in 1936. He died in 1957.

References

 

Year of birth missing
Year of death missing
Labour Party (Ireland) senators
Members of the 1922 Seanad
Members of the 1925 Seanad
Members of the 1928 Seanad
Members of the 1931 Seanad
Members of the 1934 Seanad
Irish trade unionists